The Billboard Top Folk Records of 1948 is a year-end chart compiled Billboard magazine ranking the year's top folk records based on record sales. In 1948, country music records were included on, and dominated, the Billboard folk records chart.

Eddy Arnold led all other artists with nine records on the year-end folk chart. The four top records were all by Arnold: (1) "Bouquet of Roses" with 279 points; (2) "Anytime" with 185 points; (3) "Just a Little Lovin' (Will Go a Long Way)" with 145 points; and (4) "Texarkana Baby" with 134 points.

The best selling records by artists other than Arnold were "One Has My Name (The Other Has My Heart)" by Jimmy Wakely (106 points) and "Humpty Dumpty Heart" by Hank Thompson (105 points).

See also
Billboard year-end top singles of 1948
1948 in country music

Notes

References

1948 record charts
Billboard charts